3ChordFold is the debut studio album by American producer Terrace Martin. The album was released on August 13, 2013, by AKAI Music and Empire Distribution. The album features guest appearances from Ab-Soul, Kendrick Lamar, Problem, Musiq Soulchild, Robert Glasper, James Fauntleroy, Focus..., Wiz Khalifa, Brevi, Ty Dolla Sign, Snoop Dogg and Lalah Hathaway.

Singles
On February 12, 2013, the album's first single "Something Else" featuring Problem was released. On May 7, 2013, the music video was released for "Something Else" featuring Problem. On August 2, 2013, the music video was released for "No Wrong No Right" featuring Robert Glasper and James Fauntleroy. On October 1, 2013, the music video was released for "You're The One" featuring Ty Dolla Sign.

Critical response

3ChordFold received generally positive reviews from music critics. Jay Balfour of HipHopDX gave the album four out of five stars, saying "Overall, 3ChordFold is a gratifying listen, in part, and this is beholden to Jazz albums of the past, because it’s full of memorable moments. Taken as a whole it acts as a smooth mix of R&B and Hip Hop (despite the previous term’s continually being encompassed by the second) and its best characteristic is its creator’s musicality. Even when building a song that might fit on the radio, Martin’s production has a dynamism too often missing in today’s Hip Hop. In the end, it’s hard to complain too much about a lack of truly deep lyricism when there is so much else to pick through. In 2011 Martin told MTV, “The good thing about music is you can just keep on doing it.” Free of the lifestyle agenda and celebrity of his peers, Martin may be a logical pick for continued musicianship in Hip Hop. As fans, we can only hope he just keeps on doing it." Christian Mordi of XXL gave the album an XL, saying "With strong melodies, experimental textures and an array of stellar guest spots, 3chordfold is an often excellent album. Martin continues to showcase his ability to merge a mixture of jazz and funk backdrops with his California rhymes throughout the record. While early mixtapes like Locke High and Locke High 2 introduced the underground to Terrace Martin, 3ChordFold should open the door to many mainstream fans to a talented musician." Zach Gase of RapReviews gave the album an 8.5 out of ten, saying "Terrace Martin is many things: a rapper, a producer, a saxophone player, among other things. On his debut full-length album, "3ChordFold" he expertly utilizes all of his skills to create one of the year's best records."

Track listing
Unless otherwise indicated, Credits are adapted from liner notes

Notes
All Interludes are written by Wyann Vaughn
"Can't Help It" is originally performed by Michael Jackson as "I Can't Help It"

Sample Credits
Triangle Ship
"Shhh" by Tevin Campbell
"What You Won't Do for Love" by Bobby Caldwell
Something Else
"How Deep Is Your Love" by Keith Sweat
Over Time
"Ironside" by Quincy Jones
"The Light" by Common
Move On
"Let's Chill" by Guy
Angel
"They Don't Know" by Jon B.
I'm For Real
"I'm for Real" by Howard Hewett

Personnel
Credits adapted from liner notes

 Terrace Martin: vocoder (15), bass (15, additional on 4), Fender Rhodes (8), mini moog (8), keyboard bass (6), additional keyboards (2, 4), percussion (1), saxophone (2-3, 6, 14), horn arrangements (7), instruments (all other on 10, additional on 11), mixing
 Craig Brockman: additional keyboards (2, 6, 14), Fender Rhodes (5, 11, 13), mini-moog (11), piano (1), Roland Jupiter-8 (9), additional music arrangements (5, 9)
 Neka "LB" Brown: additional vocals (1, 3, 8, 15)
 Kenneth Crouch: keyboards (15), all instruments (Interludes)
 James Fauntleroy: additional vocals (6)
 Focus...: additional vocals (7), all other instruments (7)
 Robert Glasper: piano (14), Fender Rhodes (6)
 Andrew Gouche: bass (8, 13)
 Tiffany Gouché: additional vocals (14)
 Terrence "Punch" Henderson: additional vocals (14), executive producer
 Trevor Lawrence: drums (15)
 Josef Leimberg: trumpet (1)
 Javonte Pollard: additional vocals (1, 8, 10)
 Problem: additional vocals (4), additional music arrangements (3-4)
 Tone Trezure: additional vocals (12)
 Wyann Vaughn: vocals (Interludes, additional on 6)
 Derrick "D-Loc" Walker: percussion (15)
 Marlon Williams: guitar (1, 3, 5-6, 8-10, 12-13, 15), music arrangements (15, additional on 5, 9, 13), executive producer
 Cabraeb Martinez: mastering
 Jose Cervantes: photography
 Black Ostrich Marketing & Design: art direction, design

Charts

References

2013 debut albums
Albums produced by Terrace Martin
Albums produced by 9th Wonder
Empire Distribution albums